The People's Action Party is a political party in Vanuatu founded in 2003, following a split with Vanua'aku Pati over the process of endorsing candidates for the Ambae constituency in 2002. 

At the elections held on 6 July 2004, the party won 1 out of 52 seats. It lost this seat at the 2012 election, due to it gaining only 653 voters. 

Citations:

http://archive.ipu.org/parline-e/reports/arc/2345_12.htm

Political parties in Vanuatu